Luigi Cuomo (18 February 1901 – 22 June 1993) was an Italian fencer. He competed in the team foil competition at the 1924 Summer Olympics.

References

External links
 

1901 births
1993 deaths
Italian male fencers
Olympic fencers of Italy
Fencers at the 1924 Summer Olympics